Tadzio Koelb (English: /taːdʐʉ kœlb/; born 1971) is an American novelist, translator, and critic.

Career
Koelb's first novel, Trenton Makes, appeared in March 2018. It received favorable reviews in the New York Times Book Review and the Financial Times. The Center for Fiction shortlisted the novel for the 2018 Center for Fiction First Novel Prize. The French translation of the novel was long listed for the Grand Prix de Littérature Américaine and shortlisted for the Prix du roman PAGE.

In addition to fiction, Koelb has published criticism and reviews on literature and the arts in a wide variety of publications on both sides of the Atlantic, including the New York Times,  the New Statesman,  The Guardian, Art in America, and the Times Literary Supplement. His short critical biography of Lawrence Durrell appeared as part of Scribner's Sons British Writers series, edited by Jay Parini. In 2015 Koelb published Morasses, a translation of André Gide’s novel Paludes.

Biography
Born in Washington, D.C., Koelb grew up in Brooklyn until the age of 12, when his family moved to Brussels, Belgium. He studied painting in Paris, France, and Barcelona, Spain, before earning his Master's in creative writing from the University of East Anglia in the UK. Traveling with his wife, a public health specialist and midwife, he has lived in a number of other countries, including Uzbekistan, Tunisia, Rwanda, and Madagascar. In 2016, he served as a campaign writer for Misty K. Snow, the first transgender candidate for the US Senate.

Bibliography
British writers. Retrospective supplement, Charles Scribner's Sons, 2002 
Morasses, Calypso Editions, 2015 
Trenton Makes, Doubleday, 2018

References

External links

Profile at Penguin Random House

Parsons School of Design alumni
Jewish American novelists
Living people
Belgian writers
1971 births
Alumni of the University of East Anglia
21st-century American Jews